Démolition d'un mur (Demolition of a wall) is a 1895 French short black-and-white silent film directed and produced by Louis Lumière and starring his brother Auguste Lumière, along with two other men.

Production
It was filmed by means of the Cinématographe, an all-in-one camera, which also serves as a film projector and developer. As with all early Lumière movies, this film was made in a 35 mm format with an aspect ratio of 1.33:1.

Synopsis

Another single-shot Lumière Brothers film, this time showing the demolition of a wall in the grounds of the factory.

Current status
Given its age, this short film is available to freely download from the Internet.

References

External links
 
 

1895 films
French black-and-white films
French silent short films
Films directed by Auguste and Louis Lumière
1895 short films
1890s French films